Kim Eun-sun (born 30 March 1988) is a South Korean footballer who plays as a midfielder for Gimhae.

Club career
Kim was selected in the priority pick of the 2011 K-League Draft by Gwangju FC.

Central Coast Mariners
It was announced on 2 August 2019 that Eun-sun signed a one-year deal with the Central Coast Mariners following a successful trial period.

Honours

Club
Asan Mugunghwa
 K League Challenge: 2016

References

External links

1988 births
Living people
Association football midfielders
South Korean footballers
Gwangju FC players
Suwon Samsung Bluewings players
Central Coast Mariners FC players
K League 2 players
K League 1 players
A-League Men players
Expatriate soccer players in Australia
South Korean expatriate sportspeople in Australia